Vinje is a village in Vinje Municipality in Vestfold og Telemark county, Norway. The village is located near the northwest end of the lake Vinjevatn.

Vinjesvingen is the name of a particular area in the northwest part of the village. This is a road fork where the European route E134 highway meets the Norwegian County Road 3408 which goes to Tokke Municipality. The Battle of Vinjesvingen took place at this site during World War II.

References

Vinje
Villages in Vestfold og Telemark